Helbeck is a settlement and civil parish near the village of Brough, in the Eden district, in the county of Cumbria, England. There is a wood called Helbeck Wood nearby. In 2001 the parish had a population of 19, the population taken at the 2011 Census was only minimal and is included in the parish of Brough.

History 
The name "Hillbeck" means 'Cave stream'. Hillbeck was formerly a township in the parish of Brough, in 1866 Hillbeck became a civil parish in its own right. On 18 June 1974 the parish was renamed from "Hillbeck" to "Helbeck".

See also

Listed buildings in Helbeck

References 

 Philip's Street Atlas Cumbria (page 105, 2008 edition)

External links
 Cumbria County History Trust: Helbeck (nb: provisional research only – see Talk page)

Villages in Cumbria
Civil parishes in Cumbria
Eden District